Abbas Sarkhab (born 21 March 1970) is an Iranian retired football player and coach who currently manages Kargar Boneh Gaz in the Iranian Second Division. He played for Esteghlal in the 1990s.

Managerial statistics

Honours
Esteghlal
AFC Champions League: 1990–91, 1991–92 (Runner-up)
Iran Pro League: 1989–90, 1991–92 (Runner-up), 1994–95 (Runner-up)
Hazfi Cup: 1989–90 (Runner-up)

References

1970 births
Living people
People from Hormozgan Province
Iranian footballers
Niroye Zamini players
Esteghlal F.C. players
Abbas Sarkhab
Fajr Sepasi players
Azadegan League players
Association football forwards
Iranian expatriate footballers
Iranian expatriate sportspeople in Thailand
Expatriate footballers in Thailand
Aluminium Hormozgan F.C. managers